Vojtěch Kotek (born 8 January 1988 in Prague) is a Czech actor and dubber.

Selected filmography

Film
 Snowboarďáci (2004)
 Rafťáci (2006)
 Ro(c)k podvraťáků (2006)
 Burning Bush (2013)
 Vlastníci (2019)
 Amundsen (2019)
 Poslední aristokratka (2019)
 Bird Atlas (2021)
 Kurz manželské touhy (2021)   
 Betlémské světlo (2022)

Television
 Pojišťovna štěstí (2004)
 Labyrint (2015)
 Mordparta (2016)
 Doktor Martin (2016)
 Maria Theresia (2017)
 Einstein - Případy nesnesitelného génia (2020)
 Guru (2022)

References

External links
 

1988 births
Living people
Male actors from Prague
Czech male film actors
Czech male stage actors
Czech male voice actors
Czech male television actors
21st-century Czech male actors
Czech male child actors